Founded in 1873, the Dieffenbacher Group, located in Eppingen in the administrative district of Heilbronn in Baden-Württemberg, is a family-run enterprise in the field of mechanical engineering, plant systems engineering, and construction. They develop and manufacture press systems and complete production systems for the wood composites (e.g. oriented strand boards), automobile, aerospace and recycling industries.

History 

The Company Dieffenbacher was founded in 1873 by Jakob Dieffenbacher in Eppingen. Jakob Dieffenbacher was a German master metalworker. The small enterprise performed various metalworking tasks as well as repairs of all kinds, especially for machines used in farming.

After their master's examinations, Wilhelm and Friedrich Dieffenbacher, two sons of Jacob Dieffenbacher and master metalworkers, joined the family business as the second generation. In 1910, Wilhelm and Friedrich then transferred the ownership of the metalworking shop in the historical center of Eppingen to their brother Heinrich Dieffenbacher. At the same time, a factory directed by the brothers Wilhelm and Friedrich was constructed in the Heilbronner Strasse in Eppingen. The company was then renamed to the ‘Maschinenbauanstalt J. Dieffenbacher-Söhne’ (J Dieffenbacher and Sons Engineering Company). At this time, the company's product range was actively converting to industrial products. The focus of production was on hydraulic fruit-, wine- and oil presses. With the increasing focus on the manufacture of machines, what was once known as the ‘Maschinenbauanstalt’ (Engineering company) became the ‘Maschinenfabrik’ (Machinery plant) in 1914.

After the end of the First World War, Dieffenbacher expanded its oil press and oil plant manufacturing business. In the mid-1920s, Dieffenbacher built the first hydraulic presses for use on Bakelite for the plastics industry.

In the decade after World War II, Dieffenbacher's production product range changed. The company step by step removed itself from the production of presses for fruits and oil and went for the production of heavy machinery and industrial presses.

As the third generation, Albert and Gerhard Dieffenbacher joined and assumed management of the company in 1952. Beginning in the 1950s the company set one focus amongst others on the production of particle board, veneer and ply wood presses due to the boom in the wood sector.

Dieffenbacher began receiving their first export orders from other European countries in 1956. The export business expanded rapidly beyond Europe in the 1960s with orders from countries such as the United States, Brazil, Mexico and many more.

From the 1960s onward Dieffenbacher introduced new products for the forming sector and further produced e.g. injection molding machines or presses for processing fiber-reinforced polyester plastics.

Somewhere around the middle of the 1970s, Dieffenbacher constructed a continuous cold pre-pressing system, an enormous step towards continuous particle board production for the company.

As the fourth Dieffenbacher generation, Wolf-Gerd Dieffenbacher joined the company in 1980. In the following decades the company expanded globally and became a complete systems manufacturer.

In 1999, Dieffenbacher further expanded its plastics forming technology division by developing the direct process for long-fiber-reinforced thermoplastics (D-LFTs).

In 2011, Dieffenbacher was awarded the AVK Innovation Award for the development of the direct manufacturing process for SMC parts. They also introduced the HP-RTM system to the market. In 2014, Dieffenbacher founded its Recycling division. The focus of this operation is on the manufacture of complete systems for the treatment of various industrial waste materials. Another milestone was soon to follow in 2015; In that year, Dieffenbacher presented a new continuous press for the manufacture of particle board, the CPS+, successor to the CPS press system.

Christian Dieffenbacher stepped up into company management in 2016 after two years as a consultant. In the same year, Dieffenbacher has developed the Tailored Blank Line for the mass production of locally reinforced thermoplastic components consisting of the Fibercon and the Fiberforge.

Fields of activity 

Dieffenbacher's fields of activity can be divided up into three general areas:

Wood business unit (wood-based panel technologies) 

Dieffenbacher's Wood business unit plans and constructs complete solutions for the wood products industry. Here, they manufacture production systems for particle board, medium-density fiberboard (MDF), high-density fiberboard (HDF), oriented strand boards (OSB/OSL) as well as laminated veneer lumber (LVL). Dieffenbacher supplies solutions from the shredding of the supplied wood to the pressing of the boards all the way to the application of the surface finish. A complete system for the manufacture of wooden composite board typically encompasses power-generating facilities, shredding machines, dryers, sieves and sifters, gluing apparatus, controls, forming lines, intermittent or continuous press systems, coating units, finishing-, warehousing- and process control systems as well as online maintenance systems. After-sales services and plant modernization are also a part of the range of products and services supplied by the Wood business unit.

Composites business unit (forming technologies) 

The composites division develops methods, processes and fully automated production plants for the manufacture of fiber-reinforced components. Some of the manufacturing processes are the Long Fiber Thermoplastics (LFT) Molding process, the Sheet Molding Compound (SMC) process and the High-Pressure Resin Transfer Molding (HP-RTM) process, among others. To mass-produce carbon fiber components using the HP-RTM process, Dieffenbacher produces fully automated, ready-to-use production lines that include a Preform Center. They additionally manufacture production lines for hybrid components as well as liquid resin press molding systems. Dieffenbacher supplies every element for ready-to-use systems, from the hydraulic presses to the complete automation right down to components for the manufacture of semi-finished products. The modernization of plants and their subcomponents is also a part of the Composites business unit's services. Dieffenbacher also steadily develops and combines different composites processes. The company works with independent research institutes and carries out joint research projects with customers.

Recycling business unit 

Dieffenbacher's Recycling business unit develops and produces complete recycling facilities, which treat industrial and household waste both mechanically and biologically for the reclamation of secondary resources or to generate energy. To process waste wood, for example, Dieffenbacher conceive plans for entire plants, from shredding to drying, sieving and sifting to burner systems and extraction technologies.

Companies and locations 

Locations of the Dieffenbacher Group:

General economic data 
In 2017, Dieffenbacher employed around 1,700 people at 16 locations worldwide and recorded sales of 417 million euros.

References

External links 

Video Roboforming

Companies based in Baden-Württemberg
Manufacturing companies of Germany
Eppingen